Medal of Honor: Underground is a first-person shooter video game, the second installment in the Medal of Honor video game series, and a sequel to 1999's Medal of Honor. It was initially released for the PlayStation video game console in 2000. It was developed by DreamWorks Interactive and was published by Electronic Arts.

In 2002, the game was re-released in Europe as part of the compilation Medal of Honor / Medal of Honor: Underground. It later was re-released a second time on the North American PlayStation Network for the PlayStation 3 and PlayStation Portable. It was the last game developed by DreamWorks Interactive when the studio was still jointly owned by Microsoft Games and DreamWorks SKG. During the game's release, the studio was renamed EA Los Angeles.

Gameplay 
The gameplay is much like its predecessor requiring the player to complete objectives by acquiring items, interacting with objects and destroying specified targets as well as the use of four different weapons and disguise against enemies. As well as new types of weapons, the new mechanics in the game are fighting against tanks and halftracks in three out of eight missions and fighting alongside friendly allies.

After completing the game, the player can play a non-canon bonus level, named "Panzerknacker Unleashed", in which the player plays as Lt. Jimmy Patterson. Many strange enemies are fought at a castle, including gun-toting and vehicle-driving dogs, knights carrying battle axes, zombie soldiers, robotic soldiers and several large nutcrackers, called Panzerknacker. The objective of all of the three missions available in this level is to build a Panzerknacker, who assists in the final mission.

Game Boy Advance version 
A version of Medal of Honor: Underground was released for Game Boy Advance in 2002-2003. It is a first-person shooter based on the PlayStation version. The game was developed by Rebellion Developments and published by Destination Software. Underground for the GBA features up to 4 players using the Game Boy link cable and lex levels. The game is played in a three dimensional environment. The game's objectives usually revolve around finding certain papers. There is no save system however, each level has a code to play again in the future which can be viewed by pausing the game.

Plot 
France has been occupied by Nazi Germany and Vichy France in 1940. Manon Batiste assists her brother Jacques, who is killed in an attempted heist. Manon carries out her mission for the resistance until she is found and recruited by the OSS, who assign her around North Africa and Europe to foil the Milice and Nazis' defenses and plans of invasion until 1944, when Manon returns to help liberate Paris and avenge Jacques.

Development 
The main character Manon Batiste is based on Hélène Deschamps Adams, a real-life member of the Office of Strategic Services (OSS), the forerunner of Central Intelligence Agency (CIA). Adams appears in the game's final mission to brief Manon before the level. Hirschmann, Langteau and Henson researched by meeting up with people who had been involved with the French Resistance including Elizabeth Peet McIntosh and Deschamps Adams.

Michael Giacchino explains that for "Manon, I wanted a theme that could convey one emotion at a particular moment, and then a completely different emotion the next without having to rely on two completely different themes. As a result, Manon's two main themes are very similar and yet very different. One version of the theme stays the course in a major tone, conveying a feel of great national purpose against the Nazi menace, and the secondary theme dips into a minor 6th chord which describes Manon's more intimate and emotional feelings as an individual and a woman who is pitted against the fascist war machine. Both of these themes are bookended with what liner notes author Paul Tonks has aptly named 'the resolve theme'. This theme was meant to represent the moments where Manon is called upon to steel her nerves and gather the courage to continue on with the fight....Manon travels to places that are not quite so militaristic as Jimmy Patterson. Her journey was a bit more 'scenic'." Critic Ian Lace said of her theme: "One has to suppose that the main character of this new game, Manon, inspired by the exploits of Hélène Déschamps is French. Michael Giacchino has created a theme for her that in its first few notes irresistibly makes me want to anticipate the old pop song, 'Arrivederci Roma' which I found disconcerting because she is French and so much of the action, particularly at the beginning and end, takes place in Paris."

Producer Scott Langteau offers that "Underground had an entirely different feel than the original [Medal of Honor], and yet the gameplay was entirely familiar. That's what we tried to do, anyway. In Underground, it was personal. The game's front end was gritty and less militarily organized; it was rustic and roughly hewn. The same can be said for the game. Manon used petrol bombs and also used her femininity to gain access to restricted areas. We used the freedom of telling her backstory- she was in the French Resistance, then joined the OSS-to give the game its own flair and widely varied missions that took us all over Europe: Greece, Italy, etc."

Producer Scott J. Langteau showcased the game at the E3 2000 along with Tony Rowe and Lynn Henson.

Reception 

The PlayStation version received "favorable" reviews, while the Game Boy Advance version received "unfavorable" reviews, according to video game review aggregator Metacritic. Jeff Lundrigan of NextGen said of the former version, "A terrific game gets a sequel that's in some ways even better. And after all, it's still true: at the end of the day, nothing is more satisfying than shooting a Nazi in the face." Nintendo Power gave the latter version a negative review, a few months before it was released Stateside.

GameSpot praised the makers of the PlayStation version for taking "a character from the original game named Manon Batiste and [placing] her in the lead role so that her full story can be told. This setting is a welcome change, as Underground provides a meaningful historical context that's rare in most video games today." William Abner similarly described the same version as "a refreshing change of pace because you played Manon Batiste, a woman enlisted in the French Resistance."

The PlayStation version was a runner-up for GameSpots annual "Best Sound" and "Best Shooter" awards among console games, which went to SSX and Perfect Dark, respectively. The same console version won the award for Sound at IGNs Best of 2000 Awards. It won the awards for "Outstanding Sound Design" and "Outstanding Original Music Composition" at the Academy of Interactive Arts & Sciences' Fourth Interactive Achievement Awards. It also won the award for "Best Sound" at the Official U.S. PlayStation Magazine 2000 Editors' Awards.

Notes

References

External links 
 

2000 video games
Cancelled Windows games
Electronic Arts games
First-person shooters
Multiplayer online games
Game Boy Advance games
Interactive Achievement Award winners
Underground
PlayStation (console) games
PlayStation Network games
Rebellion Developments games
Video games scored by Michael Giacchino
DreamWorks Interactive games
Video games developed in the United Kingdom
Video games featuring female protagonists
Video games set in Belgium
Video games set in France
Video games set in Germany
Video games set in Greece
Video games set in Italy
Video games set in Morocco
Video games set in Paris
World War II video games
Multiplayer and single-player video games
Destination Software games
Video games developed in the United States